St Peter's Church, Chesil, Winchester, formerly known as St Peter upon Chesille without Eastgate, is a former parish church of the Church of England in Winchester, Hampshire, and is now the home of Chesil Theatre.

The church comprises elements from the 12th century and later. It is constructed of flint and stone, and the belfry turret, and roofs are hung with tiles.

It fell out of use after the Second World War and was declared structurally unsafe in 1960. It was then acquired by the Chesil Theatre company.

Organ
The church contained a small one-manual pipe organ. A specification of the organ can be found on the National Pipe Organ Register.

References

Grade II* listed buildings in Hampshire
Church of England church buildings in Hampshire
St Peter